Andrés Antonio Parada Barrera (born 20 March 1984) is a Chilean footballer. 

He played for Deportes Iquique.

Honours

Club
Universidad Católica
 Primera División de Chile (1): 2005 Clausura

Provincial Osorno
 Primera B (1): 2007

References

1984 births
Living people
Chilean footballers
Chilean Primera División players
Provincial Osorno footballers
Deportes Copiapó footballers
O'Higgins F.C. footballers
Club Deportivo Universidad Católica footballers
San Luis de Quillota footballers
Santiago Morning footballers
Association football goalkeepers